Gaztaf, also rendered as Gaz Saf, may refer to:
 Gaztaf-e Olya
 Gaztaf-e Sofla